The herringbone pattern is an arrangement of rectangles used for floor tilings and road pavement, so named for a fancied resemblance to the bones of a fish such as a herring.

The blocks can be rectangles or parallelograms. The block edge length ratios are usually 2:1, and sometimes 3:1, but need not be even ratios.

The herringbone pattern has a symmetry of wallpaper group pgg, as long as the blocks are not of different color (i.e., considering the borders alone).

Herringbone patterns can be found in wallpaper, mosaics, seating, cloth and clothing (herringbone cloth), shoe tread, security printing, herringbone gears, jewellery, sculpture, and elsewhere.

Examples

Related tilings
As a geometric tessellation, the herringbone pattern is topologically identical to the regular hexagonal tiling. This can be seen if the rectangular blocks are distorted slightly.

In parquetry, more casually known as flooring, herringbone patterns can be accomplished in wood, brick, and tile. Subtle alternating colors may be used to create a distinctive floor pattern, or the materials used may be the same, causing the floor to look uniform from a distance. Laying a herringbone floor is very challenging, since the multitude of small rows must be made to line up smoothly, which can be difficult in a room which is not perfectly flat. Small mistakes in a herringbone floor can be rather glaring because of the way the pattern lines up, so care must be taken.

Masonry also utilizes herringbone, often as an accent pattern on the sides of buildings and other structures. A floor or outdoor walkway made from stone or brick may be made entirely from herringbone, or herringbone stripes may be integrated into other patterns. Just like with flooring, the rows must be carefully aligned to maintain the integrity of the pattern.

See also 
 Herringbone cloth
 Herringbone gear

References

 (Page 476, Tilings by polygons, #19 of 56 polygonal isohedral types by quadrangles)

External links

Pavements
Patterns